The 2005 Tashkent Open was a women's tennis tournament played on outdoor hard courts. It was the 7th edition of the event, and part of the Tier IV Series of the 2005 WTA Tour. It took place at the Tashkent Tennis Center in Tashkent, Uzbekistan, from 3 October through 9 October 2005. Fifth-seeded Michaëlla Krajicek won the singles title and earned $22,000 first-prize money.

Finals

Singles

 Michaëlla Krajicek defeated  Akgul Amanmuradova 6–0, 4–6, 6–3
It was Krajicek's 1st singles career title on the WTA Tour.

Doubles

 Maria Elena Camerin /  Émilie Loit defeated  Anastasia Rodionova /  Galina Voskoboeva 6–3,  6–0

References

External links
 ITF tournament edition details
 Tournament draws

 
Tashkent Open
Tashkent
Tashkent Open
Tashkent Open